Massey may refer to:

Places

Canada
 Massey, Ontario
 Massey Island, Nunavut

New Zealand
 Massey, New Zealand, an Auckland suburb

United States
 Massey, Alabama
 Massey, Iowa
 Massey, Maryland

People 
 Massey (surname)

Education 
 Massey College, affiliated with the University of Toronto
 Massey University, New Zealand
 Massey High School, in Auckland, New Zealand

Other uses 
 Massey Energy, an American coal-producing company
 USS Massey (DD-778), a US Navy destroyer 
 Massey Brothers, a British coachbuilder based in Pemberton, Wigan, purchased by Northern Counties in 1967
 Massey product, a cohomology operation of higher order generalizing the cup product
 Massey Ferguson, an American heavy equipment company
 An alternative reading of Masei, the final parashah of the Book of Numbers

See also
 Massee, a surname
 Massey (surname)
 Massie (surname)
 Massie (disambiguation)